The 2015–16 Weber State Wildcats men's basketball team represented Weber State University during the 2015–16 NCAA Division I men's basketball season. The Wildcats were led by tenth-year head coach Randy Rahe and played their home games at the Dee Events Center in Ogden, Utah. They were members of the Big Sky Conference. The Wilsdcats finished the season 26–9, 15–3 in Big Sky play to win the regular season championship. They defeated Portland State, North Dakota, and Montana in the Big Sky tournament. to earn the conference's automatic bid to the NCAA tournament. As a No. 15 seed in the NCAA Tournament, they lost to Xavier in the first round.

Previous season
The Wildcats finished the 2014–15 season 13–17, 8–10 in Big Sky play to finish in a tie for seventh place. They lost in the quarterfinals of the Big Sky tournament to Montana.

Departures

Incoming Transfers

2015 incoming recruits

2016 incoming recruits

Roster

Schedule

|-
!colspan=9 style=|Exhibition

|-
!colspan=9 style=| Non-conference regular season

|-
!colspan=9 style=|Big Sky regular season

|-
!colspan=9 style=| Big Sky tournament

|-
!colspan=9 style=|NCAA tournament

References

Weber State Wildcats men's basketball seasons
Weber State
Weber State
Weber State Wildcats men's basketball
Weber State Wildcats men's basketball